For information on all Weber State University sports, see Weber State Wildcats

The Weber State Wildcats football program is the intercollegiate American football team for Weber State University, located in Ogden, Utah. The team competes in the NCAA Division I Football Championship Subdivision (FCS) and is a charter member of the Big Sky Conference, founded in 1963. The school's first football team was fielded a year earlier in 1962. Home games are played at the 17,312-seat Stewart Stadium. After the 2022 departure of Jay Hill, the winningest coach in program history, the Wildcats will be led by coach Mickey Mental beginning in 2023.

History

Classifications
 1962–1972: NCAA College Division
 1973–1977: NCAA Division II
 1978–present: NCAA Division I–AA / FCS

Conference memberships
 1962: Independent
 1963–present: Big Sky Conference

Postseason results
Weber State's first postseason appearance was in 1987.

Division I-AA/FCS Playoffs
The Wildcats have appeared in the I-AA/FCS playoffs ten times, with an overall record of 8–9.

{| class="wikitable"
|-

|-
| 1987 || First RoundQuarterfinals ||@ Idaho@ Marshall || W 59–30L23–51 || align=center|Mike Price
|-
| 1991 || First Round || @ Northern Iowa || L21–38 ||align=center|Dave Arslanian
|-
| 2008 || First RoundQuarterfinals || @ Cal Poly@ Montana || W 49–35L13–24 ||align=center rowspan=2|Ron McBride
|-
| 2009 || First Round || @ William & Mary || L25–38
|-
| 2016 || First Round || @ Chattanooga || L14–45 ||align=center rowspan=6|Jay Hill
|-
| 2017 || First RoundSecond RoundQuarterfinals || Western Illinois@ Southern Utah@ James Madison || W 21–19 W 30–13L28–31
|-
| 2018 || Second RoundQuarterfinals || SE Missouri StateMaine || W 48–23L18–23
|-
| 2019 || Second RoundQuarterfinalsSemifinals || Kennesaw StateMontana@ James Madison || W 26–20W 17–10L14–30
|-
| 2020 || First Round || Southern Illinois|| L 31–34
|-
| 2022 || First RoundSecond Round || North Dakota@ Montana State || W 38–31L25-33
|}

Retired Numbers

Jamie Martin led the NCAA Division I-AA in passing (336.4 yards per game) and total offense (337.6 yards per game) in 1990.  He was named to the First-team All-Big Sky Conference.

Martin followed his strong sophomore campaign with a spectacular junior year  in 1991.  He completed 310 of 500 passes for 4,125 yards and 35 touchdowns.  He again led the Division I-AA in passing (375.0 yards per game) and total offense (394.3 yards per game).  Martin set Division I-AA records for pass completions (47), passing yards (624), and total offense yards (643) in a game against Idaho State. Martin was named First-team All-American and was awarded the Walter Payton Award, given annually to the top Division I-AA player in the nation.

In his senior season in 1992, he led the Big Sky in passing (291.5 yards per game) and earned Third-team All-American honors.  Martin finished his career as the all-time leader in passing (12,207 yards) and total offense (12,287 yards) in the history of Division I-AA football.  His 87 career touchdown passes were a Big Sky record.  He played in the 1993 East–West Shrine Game and the Hula Bowl.

National Award Winners
Walter Payton Award

The Walter Payton Award is awarded annually to the most outstanding offensive player in the NCAA Division I Football Championship Subdivision (formerly Division I-AA) of college football.

All-Americans
 Lee White, RB- 1967 (Time 1st Team)
 Lee White, FB- 1967 (FN 1st Team)
 Jamie Martin, Quarterback- 1991 (1st Team)
 Jamie Martin, Quarterback- 1992 (3rd Team)

Notable former players

Robb Akey
Bob Bees
Jeff Carlson
Carter Campbell
Chris Darrington
Wade Davis
John Fassel
J.D. Folsom
Halvor Hagen
David Hale
Cameron Higgins
Taron Johnson
Al Lolotai
Jamie Martin
Anthony Parker
Ryan Prince
Bob Pollard
Darryl Pollard
Alfred Pupunu
Marcus Mailei
Pat McQuistan
Paul McQuistan
Sua Opeta
Brad Otton
Cam Quayle
Henry Reed
Roger Ruzek
Jim Schmedding
Rashid Shaheed
Scott Shields
Tim Toone
Andrew Vollert
Jonah Williams

References

External links
 

 
American football teams established in 1962
1962 establishments in Utah